David Pryor (3 February 1870 – 3 January 1937) was an Australian cricketer. He played five first-class matches for New South Wales in 1895/96.

See also
 List of New South Wales representative cricketers

References

External links
 

1870 births
1937 deaths
Australian cricketers
New South Wales cricketers
People from Maitland, New South Wales
Cricketers from New South Wales